The Hunter 27 Edge is an American trailerable sailboat that was designed in 2006 by the Hunter Design Team as a hybrid motorsailer and first built in 2008.

The design was sold by the manufacturer under the marketing name TheEDGE, but is now usually referred to as the Hunter 27 Edge.

Production
The design was built by Hunter Marine in the United States between 2008 and 2012, but it is now out of production.

Design
The Hunter 27 Edge is a recreational motorsailer, built predominantly of fiberglass. It has a fractional sloop B&R rig, a raked stem, a walk-through reverse transom with a swimming platform, an internally-mounted spade-type rudder controlled by a wheel and a retractable centerboard keel.

The design displaces  empty of ballast,  with full water ballast and carries  of flooding water ballast. The ballast is required for sailing but is drained for road transport and powered use.

The design was advertised as being suitable for towing water skiers.

The design has a hull speed of  when in displacement mode.

See also
List of sailing boat types

Related development
Hunter 27
Hunter 27-2
Hunter 27-3
Hunter 27X

Similar sailboats
Gougeon 32
Hunter 19-2
Hunter 23.5
Hunter 240
Hunter 260
MacGregor 26

References

External links
Official factory brochure

Keelboats
2000s sailboat type designs
Sailing yachts
Trailer sailers
Sailboat type designs by Hunter Design Team
Sailboat types built by Hunter Marine